Arthrostylidium urbanii is a species of Arthrostylidium bamboo in the grass family.

Distribution 
Arthrostylidium urbanii is native to Cuba.

Description 
Arthrostylidium urbanii is a slender perennial species that grows to 500–700 mm in height. It possesses 3 Lodicules, 3 Anthers and 2 stigmas.

References 

urbanii
Flora of Cuba
Flora without expected TNC conservation status